Bonifay is a city in Holmes County, Florida, United States. As of the 2020 census, the population was 2,759. It is the county seat of Holmes County.

Bonifay was founded in 1882 when the Pensacola and Atlantic Railroad was built across the Florida Panhandle, and was named by P&A executive W. D. Chipley for Frank Bonifay, member of a prominent family who had a brickmaking factory in Pensacola, where the P&A was headquartered.  Frank Bonifay bought a stake in the P&A, which in 1891 was merged into the Louisville and Nashville Railroad, which after several more mergers became part of CSX Transportation in 1986.  On June 1, 2019, the Florida Gulf & Atlantic Railroad acquired most of the CSX line from Pensacola to Jacksonville.

Geography
Bonifay is located in southeastern Holmes County at 30°47′N 85°41′W (30.791, –85.681. U.S. Route 90 runs through the southern part of the downtown area, leading east  to Chipley and west  to Caryville. Interstate 10 passes through the southern edge of town, with access from Exit 112 (Florida State Road 79). I-10 leads east  to Tallahassee and west  to Pensacola. SR 79 (Waukesha Street) connects I-10 and US-90 and passes through the center of Bonifay, leading north  to Esto and south  to Vernon.

Education
Holmes District School Board operates public schools. Bonifay is home to three schools Bonifay K-8 School, Holmes County High School and Bethlehem School.

A 2004 study by the Bureau of Secondary Education showed that 56.73% of Holmes County high school graduates go on to secondary education. Of these, 38.03% of those go on to complete a bachelor's degree, furthermore 12.60% of these students who receive a bachelors go on to receive a masters or doctoral degree. As of August 2008 all educational facility improvements shall be done in a financially feasible manner to address all Level of Service (LOS) needs as described by the Public School Facilities Element in the City of Bonifay 2020 Comprehensive Plan, officially recognized by the state of Florida on September 3, 2008.

 a new K–8 school is being built in Bonifay to replace Bonifay Elementary and Bonifay Middle. Construction began in 2015 and it was scheduled to be completed in May 2017.

Holmes County Public Library is located in Bonifay.

Demographics

As of the census of 2010, there were 2,793 people, 1,090 households, and 659 families residing in the city. There were 1,267 housing units, 14.0% of which were vacant. The racial makeup of the city was 84.8% White, 10.0% Black, 0.9% Native American, 0.9% Asian, 0.1% Pacific Islander, 0.7% some other race, and 2.7% from two or more races. Hispanic or Latino of any race were 2.4% of the population.

There were 1,090 households, out of which 33.6% had children under the age of 18 living with them, 36.1% were headed by married couples living together, 19.5% had a female householder with no husband present, and 39.5% were non-families. 34.4% of all households were made up of individuals, and 16.8% were someone living alone who was 65 years of age or older. The average household size was 2.41, and the average family size was 3.05.

In the city, 25.1% of the population were under the age of 18, 8.6% were from 18 to 24, 20.6% were from 25 to 44, 25.3% were from 45 to 64, and 20.3% were 65 years of age or older. The median age was 40.8 years. For every 100 females, there were 84.7 males. For every 100 females age 18 and over, there were 77.4 males.

For the period of 2011–2015, the estimated median annual income for a household in the city was $25,060, and the median income for a family was $37,407. Male full-time workers had a median income of $41,458 versus $35,054 for females. The per capita income for the city was $15,830. About 20.7% of families and 28.8% of the population were below the poverty line, including 26.5% of those under age 18 and 14.8% of those age 65 or over.

Current growth
While growth of the town of Bonifay has recently been stagnant there is promise of growth in the near future with Florida State Road 79 being converted in to a four lane highway between Bonifay and Panama City Beach. There are currently plans to extend the commercial zone areas of Bonifay south of Interstate 10 to the Washington County line.

Notable people

 Nancy Springer, prolific author of children's fiction, lives in Bonifay

Newspapers
 Holmes County Times-Advertiser

Images

References

External links

County seats in Florida
Cities in Holmes County, Florida
Cities in Florida